Donald Francis O'Donoghue (born August 27, 1949 — June 4, 2007) was a Canadian professional ice hockey right wing who played 147 games in the National Hockey League for the Oakland Seals/California Golden Seals between 1969 and 1972. He would also play 125 games in the World Hockey Association for the Philadelphia Blazers, Vancouver Blazers and Cincinnati Stingers between 1972 and 1976.

Playing career
O'Donoghue played junior for the St. Catharines Black Hawks of the Ontario Hockey Association. He was selected 29th overall by the Oakland Seals in the 1969 NHL Amateur Draft, and made his professional debut with the team that year. He spent parts of three seasons with the Seals, also playing for their American Hockey League affiliates. 

Along with Boston Bruins defenseman Carol Vadnais, he was part of the February, 1972 trade that sent forward Reggie Leach and defensemen Rick Smith and Bob Stewart to the Golden Seals. He spent the remainder of the season in the minor leagues then signed with the rival WHA afterward. He played four seasons in the WHA, as well as three more in the minor leagues, before retiring in 1978.

Post-playing career
In later life he ran a restaurant in California until his death from kidney cancer in 2007.

Career statistics

Regular season and playoffs

References

External links

1949 births
2007 deaths
Baltimore Clippers players
Boston Braves (AHL) players
Broome Dusters players
California Golden Seals players
Canadian ice hockey forwards
Cincinnati Stingers players
Deaths from cancer in California
Hampton Gulls (AHL) players
Hampton Gulls (SHL) players
Ice hockey people from Ontario
Oakland Seals draft picks
Oakland Seals players
Philadelphia Blazers players
Sportspeople from Kingston, Ontario
St. Catharines Black Hawks players
Tulsa Oilers (1964–1984) players
Vancouver Blazers players